Yeo Hyo-Jin (25 April 1983 – 31 July 2021) was a South Korean professional footballer who played as a defender. He took part in the 2003 U-20 World Cup and 2004 Athens Summer Olympics. At the club level, he played for FC Seoul, Tochigi SC, Busan IPark, and Goyang Hi FC.

Career statistics

External links
 
 
 

1983 births
2021 deaths
Association football defenders
South Korean footballers
FC Seoul players
Gimcheon Sangmu FC players
Tochigi SC players
Goyang Zaicro FC players
K League 1 players
J2 League players
K League 2 players
South Korean expatriate footballers
South Korean expatriate sportspeople in Japan
Expatriate footballers in Japan
Korea University alumni